The Tuvan Autonomous Oblast was an autonomous oblast of the Soviet Union, created on 11 October 1944 following the annexation of the Tuvan People's Republic by the Soviet Union. On 10 October 1961, it was transformed into the Tuvan Autonomous Soviet Socialist Republic. On 31 March 1992, its successor, the Tuva Republic, became a constituent member of the Russian Federation.

See also
Tuva
List of leaders of Communist Tuva
First Secretary of the Tuvan Communist Party

Notes

References

Autonomous oblasts of the Soviet Union
States and territories established in 1944
States and territories disestablished in 1961
History of Tuva